The 3rd constituency of Val-de-Marne is a French legislative constituency in the Val-de-Marne département.

Description

The 3rd constituency of Val-de-Marne covers the south east corner of the department. The constituency lies to the east of Orly Airport and has a mix of light industrial and residential areas it also contains the largest area of green space in the department the Forêt de Notre-Dame.

The constituency has returned Roger-Gérard Schwartzenberg of the PRG at every election since 1988 until the 2007 when it was narrowly won by the UMP. Schwartzenberg reclaimed the seat at the 2012 election, but lost it to Laurent Saint-Martin of La République En Marche! at the 2017 election.

Historic representation

Election results

2022

 
 
 
 
 
 
 
|-
| colspan="8" bgcolor="#E9E9E9"|
|-

2017

 
 
 
 
 
 
 
|-
| colspan="8" bgcolor="#E9E9E9"|
|-

2012

 
 
 
 
 
 
|-
| colspan="8" bgcolor="#E9E9E9"|
|-

2007

 
 
 
 
 
 
 
|-
| colspan="8" bgcolor="#E9E9E9"|
|-

2002

 
 
 
 
 
|-
| colspan="8" bgcolor="#E9E9E9"|
|-

1997

 
 
 
 
 
 
 
|-
| colspan="8" bgcolor="#E9E9E9"|
|-

Sources
Official results of French elections from 2002: "Résultats électoraux officiels en France" (in French).

3